Robert Gutton (fl. 1384–1397), of Dorchester, Dorset, was an English politician.

He married Alice Rede. He was a Member (MP) of the Parliament of England for Dorchester in November 1384, 1393 and September 1397.

References

Year of birth missing
Year of death missing
English MPs November 1384
Members of the Parliament of England for Dorchester
English MPs 1393
English MPs September 1397